Thinking It Over may refer to:
Thinking It Over (album), 2002 album by Liberty X
"Thinking It Over" (song), 2001 single by Liberty X
"Thinkin' It Over", 1971 song by John Entwistle from the album Whistle Rymes